Kuhlman may refer to:

Adam Kuhlman, animation director
Carolina Kuhlman (1778–1866), Swedish actress
Kathryn Kuhlman (1907–1976), American evangelist
Jeffrey Kuhlman (born 1963), American physician
Peter Kuhlman, Danish headmaster
Ray Kuhlman (c. 1919–2003), American pilot and businessman
Ray Kuhlman (politician) (1900–1956), American politician
Evan Kuhlman, American children's author

See also
 G. C. Kuhlman Car Company
 Cullmann, a surname
 Kehlmann, a surname
 Kuhlmann (disambiguation)
 Kullmann, a surname